Elections were held in Illinois on Tuesday, November 4, 1980.

Primaries were held on March 18.

Election information

Turnout
Turnout in the primary election was 43.50%, with a total of 2,493,518 ballots cast. 1,321,810 Democratic and 1,171,708 Republican primary ballots were cast.

Turnout during the general election was 78.14%, with 4,868,623 ballots cast.

Federal elections

United States President

Illinois voted for Republican ticket of Ronald Reagan and George H. W. Bush.

This was the fourth consecutive election in which the state had voted for the Republican ticket in a presidential election.

United States Senate

Incumbent Democrat Adlai Stevenson III, did not seek reelection. Democrat Alan J. Dixon was elected to succeed him.

United States House

In a January 22, 1980 special election for Illinois's 10th congressional district, Republican John Porter captured what had previously been a Democratic-held seat.

All of Illinois' 24 congressional seats were up for reelection in November 1980.

In the November election, none of Illinois' seats switched parties, with there remaining 14 Republican and seats 10 Democratic seats in Illinois' House of Representatives delegation.

State elections

State Senate
Some seats of the Illinois Senate were up for election in 1980. Democrats retained control of the chamber.

State House of Representatives
All of the seats in the Illinois House of Representatives were up for election in 1980. Republicans flipped control of the chamber.

Trustees of University of Illinois

An election was held for three of nine seats for Trustees of University of Illinois system. 

The election saw the reelection first-term incumbent Democratic Nina T. Shepherd and the election of new members, Republicans Galey S. Day and Dean E. Madden.

First-term incumbent Democrats Arthur R. Velasquez and Robert J. Lenz lost reelection.

Judicial elections
Multiple judicial positions were up for election in 1980.

Ballot measures
Illinois voters voted on a two ballot measures in 1980. In order to be approved, the measures required either 60% support among those specifically voting on the measure or 50% support among all ballots cast in the elections.

The two measures were approved, becoming the first amendments to be successfully made following the passage of the 1970 Constitution of Illinois.

Size of State House of Representatives Amendment

Voters approved the Size of State House of Representatives Amendment (also known as "Amendment 1", the "Legislative Article", and the "Cutback Amendment"), which was an initiated constitutional amendment that amended Article IV, Sections 1, 2 and 3 of the Constitution of Illinois to reduce the size of the Illinois House of Representatives from 177 to 118 members, eliminated cumulative voting, and replace the use of multi-member districts with single-member districts.

Sale of Tax Delinquent Property Amendment
Voters approved the Sale of Tax Delinquent Property Amendment (also known as the "Revenue Article" and "Article 2"), which was a legislatively referred constitutional amendment that amended Article IX, Section 8 of the Constitution of Illinois to reduce the redemption period on the sale of tax delinquent property.

Local elections
Local elections were held.

References

 
Illinois